Róbert Koltai (born 16 December 1943) is a Hungarian actor, film director and screenwriter. He has appeared in over 90 films since 1967. He appeared in the 1976 film Man Without a Name, which was entered into the 26th Berlin International Film Festival, where it won the Silver Bear for an outstanding single achievement. He also appeared in Béla Tarr's 1981 film, The Prefab People. From the 1990s onwards, Koltai also worked as a successful film director.

Selected filmography
 Man Without a Name (1976)
  (1983)
 Sound Eroticism (1986)
 Love, Mother (1987)
 Memories of a River (1990)
 We Never Die (1993)
 Samba (1996)
 Out of Order (1997)

References

External links

1943 births
Living people
Hungarian male film actors
Hungarian film directors
Hungarian screenwriters
Male screenwriters
Hungarian male writers